Lenita Anneli Toivakka (born 28 September 1961 in Helsinki) is a Finnish politician and a member of National Coalition Party.

Political career
Toivakka is the former Minister for European Affairs and Foreign Trade and Minister for Foreign Trade and Development serving in both in Alexander Stubb's cabinet and Juha Sipilä's cabinet. During her time in office, Finland’s government decided to slash development assistance by 43 percent in 2015. She also served as member of the World Bank Group’s (WBG) Advisory Council on Gender and Development.

On 21 June 2016, Toivakka announced that she would resign due to the tax shelter methods used by her family company and the resulting negative publicity to the party. She was followed by Kai Mykkänen.

Other activities
 Finnish Institute of International Affairs (FIIA), Member of the Board

References

|-

1961 births
Living people
Politicians from Helsinki
National Coalition Party politicians
Government ministers of Finland
Members of the Parliament of Finland (2007–11)
Members of the Parliament of Finland (2011–15)
Members of the Parliament of Finland (2015–19)
Women government ministers of Finland
21st-century Finnish women politicians